FNUF may refer to:
 United Nations Forum on Forests (UNFF), in its French-language abbreviation
 Front national pour l’unité française, a predecessor of the French right-wing party Front National